La Patria is a newspaper published in Oruro, Bolivia. The newspaper began publication on 19 March 1919.

References

Newspapers published in Bolivia
Newspapers established in 1919
1919 establishments in Bolivia
Spanish-language newspapers